Nicholas John Frost (born 28 March 1972) is a British actor, author, comedian, painter, producer and screenwriter. He has appeared in the Three Flavours Cornetto trilogy of films, consisting of Shaun of the Dead (2004), Hot Fuzz (2007), and The World's End (2013), and the television comedy Spaced (1999–2001). He also appeared in Joe Cornish's film Attack the Block (2011). He co-starred in the 2011 film Paul, which he co-wrote with frequent collaborator and best friend Simon Pegg. He has also portrayed various roles in the sketch show Man Stroke Woman. In 2020, he co-created and starred in the paranormal comedy horror series Truth Seekers with Pegg.

Early life
Frost was born on 28 March 1972 in Hornchurch, East London, the son of John Frost and his Welsh wife, Tricia (died 2005), who were office furniture designers. When he was 10, his sister died of an asthma attack, aged 18. He attended Beal High School in Ilford. When Frost was 15 his parents' business failed and they lost the family home. They moved in with neighbours where he witnessed his mother having a stroke due to the stress. Frost left school and took a job with a shipping company to support the family. He subsequently spent two years at a kibbutz in Israel. He met actor Simon Pegg while working as a waiter at a North London Mexican restaurant and the two became close friends and flatmates. Pegg and Jessica Hynes wrote a role for Frost in the cult slacker comedy series, Spaced, that was partly based on Pegg and Frost's lifestyle at the time.

Career
He appeared in corporate training video clips such as "Chris Carter and the Coverplan Challenge", a Dixons sales video, before playing Tim's army-obsessed best friend Mike in Spaced (1999–2001), which aired on Channel 4 for two series. In 2001, Frost played a small role in a one-off episode of Victoria Wood's Acorn Antiques. This was a specially written episode shown during the series called "The Sketch Show Story" that Victoria narrated, in which Frost played an armed robber who shot dead Acorn Antiques' most lovable character, Mrs Overall.

In 2002, Frost wrote and presented the show Danger! 50,000 Volts!, a spoof of the outdoors survival genre in which military experts demonstrate how to improvise solutions to dangerous problems. In the same year, Frost co-wrote and starred in The Sofa of Time with Matt King. In 2004, he appeared in Shaun of the Dead, a "romantic zombie comedy", written by Simon Pegg and Spaced director Edgar Wright. In late 2005, Frost starred in the comedy sketch show Man Stroke Woman on BBC Three. A second series aired on in early 2007. In early 2006, Frost played Commander Henderson in two series of the BBC Two science fiction sitcom, Hyperdrive. Also in 2006, he acted in Kinky Boots. Frost had a small appearance in the British comedy Look Around You, a parody of 1970s/1980s technology parodying the format of shows like Tomorrow's World.

Frost and Pegg appeared in a second Pegg-Wright feature film called Hot Fuzz, an action and cop genre homage, set in Gloucestershire. Frost plays bumbling Constable Danny Butterman, who partners up with Pegg's dynamic Nicholas Angel after the latter is transferred from the Metropolitan Police in London. The pair teamed up again for their self-penned 2011 science fiction comedy film Paul, whose storyline concerned a fugitive alien. The two also starred in Steven Spielberg's The Adventures of Tintin: Secret of the Unicorn as Thomson and Thompson. Frost narrates the Channel 4 reality show Supernanny. He has made fleeting appearances in the Channel 4 surreal medical comedy series Green Wing as "just a man" in pub scenes (when Boyce asks who he is, he responds, "just a man"). In 2013, Frost played the role of Andy Knightley in the third Pegg-Wright feature film called The World's End. In 2014, he played the eponymous character in the Sky Atlantic comedy, Mr. Sloane.

In 2016, Frost was cast in an ensemble role for the second season of the AMC television series Into the Badlands.

Personal life
Frost is a close friend of fellow actor Simon Pegg and the two have appeared alongside each other in six films. In a 2005 interview, Frost stated that he was brought up as a Catholic but is now an atheist. Frost is a patron of Humanists UK. He is a supporter of West Ham United and the England national football team, as well as being a rugby player, formerly playing for Barking RFC.

Frost lived with his half-Swedish wife, production executive Mariangela,<ref>{{cite news|url= https://www.independent.co.uk/news/people/profiles/nick-frost-ill-do-anything-for-money-1977360.html |archive-url=https://ghostarchive.org/archive/20220620/https://www.independent.co.uk/news/people/profiles/nick-frost-ill-do-anything-for-money-1977360.html |archive-date=20 June 2022 |url-access=subscription |url-status=live|location=London|work=The Independent|title=Nick Frost: 'I'll do anything for Money'''|date=23 May 2010|access-date=31 July 2018}}</ref> in St Margarets, London. They married in 2008. He previously lived in Finsbury Park, which was also one of the filming locations for Shaun of the Dead. On 22 June 2011, Mariangela gave birth to the couple's son. They separated in 2013, and later divorced.

In October 2015, Frost released a memoir titled Truths, Half Truths & Little White Lies'' (Hodder & Stoughton), detailing his life up to the age of 30.

Filmography

Film

Television

Radio

Video games

Awards and nominations

References

External links

Interview on Marc Maron's WTF podcast, Episode 535, September 2014

1972 births
Living people
20th-century English male actors
21st-century English male actors
Audiobook narrators
Barking Rugby Football Club players
British male comedy actors
British parodists
English atheists
English male comedians
English male film actors
English male television actors
English male voice actors
Former Roman Catholics
Male actors from Essex
Male actors from London
People from Hornchurch